Marco Simone (born 7 January 1969) is an Italian professional football manager and former player. As a player, he was a striker and winger. 

He most prominently played for Milan, with whom he won four Serie A championships and two UEFA Champions League titles, as well as in France's Ligue 1 for Paris Saint-Germain and Monaco. At international level, Simone played four games for the Italy national team.

As a manager, Simone has coached Monaco, Tours, Laval and Châteauroux. He also had brief spells in Switzerland, Tunisia, Thailand and Morocco.

Club career

Early career
Simone was born in Castellanza. He debuted in Serie A for Como on 11 January 1987. After a few appearances in the top-flight Serie A, he was put on loan at Virescit Boccaleone in the secondary Serie C1 league. He scored 15 goals for Virescit in the 1987–88 season, and finished as top scorer of the Serie C1 league.

He returned to Como for the 1988–89 Serie A season, in which he scored 6 goals. Como finished dead last in the tournament, and was relegated to Serie B.

AC Milan
In the summer of 1989, Simone was brought into the squad of third-place finishers AC Milan by manager Arrigo Sacchi. His stay at Milan would be long and successful, as he won the 1990 European Cup under manager Sacchi, as well as four Serie A titles in five years from 1992 to 1996 and the 1994 UEFA Champions League under the management of Fabio Capello.

His best season for AC Milan came during the 1994–95 Serie A season, where he scored 17 goals in 30 games, as well as 4 in the Champions League, for a total of 21 goals in all competitions, as Milan reached the 1995 UEFA Champions League Final, only to be defeated by Ajax. He also managed 11 goals in all competitions during the 1995–96 season, 8 of which came in Serie A, finishing as the club's second highest goalscorer behind George Weah as Milan won the Serie A title. Despite competing for the attacking spots at Milan with the three FIFA World Player of the Year award winners Marco van Basten (1992), Roberto Baggio (1993) and George Weah (1995) (as well as the presence of Ruud Gullit, Dejan Savićević, Daniele Massaro, Paolo Di Canio, Jean-Pierre Papin, Christophe Dugarry, and Brian Laudrup), he scored a total of 74 goals in 245 games in all competitions for Milan.

Later career in France, Monaco and return to Italy
In 1997, Simone moved abroad to play for French club Paris Saint-Germain, with whom he won both domestic cups in his first season. He scored in both the Coupe de la Ligue final and the Coupe de France final against Bordeaux and Lens respectively. He transferred to Monaco in 1999. He scored 21 goals and made 15 assists in 34 games during the 1999–2000 season, and helped Monaco win the Ligue 1 championship in 2000. He returned to Milan for parts of the 2001–02 Serie A season, scoring his last goal with the Rossoneri in Coppa Italia against Lazio in 2002. He returned to Monaco, but rarely played during the 2002–03 Ligue 1 season.

Following an unsuccessful season playing for Nice, he retired from football in 2004, at the age of 35. He made a short come-back as he played a single game for Serie C2 club Legnano in 2005.

International career 
During his time with Milan, Simone also made his senior debut for the Italy national team on 19 December 1992, under then national team manager Arrigo Sacchi, in a 2–1 away win in a 1994 World Cup qualifier against Malta. He would go on to play four games in total for the national team between 1992 and 1996, but did not score any goals for Italy.

Style of play
Simone was a diminutive forward, gifted with pace, good movement, an eye for goal, and excellent technique. He was capable of playing in several attacking positions, and was best used as a second striker, due to his small stature and slender physical build, although he was also capable of playing in a central role as a main striker, or even as a winger.

Managerial career

Monaco 
On 12 September 2011, Simone got his first managerial job at former club Monaco, succeeding Laurent Banide at a club 17th in Ligue 2. He was fired at the end of the season with the club having finished 8th and not met their aim of instant promotion, despite the investment of billionaire new owner Dmitry Rybolovlev.

Lausanne-Sport 
Simone became Technical Director at Lausanne-Sport of the Swiss Challenge League in November 2013, and 11 months later he replaced Francesco Gabriele as manager. He was sacked on 24 March 2015 with the team in seventh having earned one point from six games in the calendar year.

Tours and Laval 
On 25 June 2015, Simone returned to France's second tier with Tours FC. He finished the season in 9th, and quit despite having a year left on his contract, due to disputes with the board.

Still in the same league, Simone was hired at 18th-placed Laval on 8 November 2016. The following 11 April he was dismissed, with the team in last position.

Club Africain 
In July 2017, Simone joined Club Africain in Tunisia. Four months into a two-year contract, he quit the 12th-placed club. Through FIFA, he sued the club for the remainder of his salary, and won €630,000 in July 2019. In April 2018 he was one of 77 applicants for the vacant Cameroon national team job.

Ratchaburi Mitr Phol and Mohammédia 
Simone became manager of the Thai Premier League's Ratchaburi Mitr Phol F.C. on 25 March 2019. He left in July, with a record of eight wins from 18 games, as he said he had an offer from a European club. He instead joined SCC Mohammédia in Morocco's Botola 2. Within another four months, he was dismissed despite the team leading the league, and refused a backroom job with the club.

Châteauroux 
On 10 March 2021, Simone became the manager of Ligue 2 club Châteauroux. He was appointed following the takeover by Saudi prince Abdullah bin Musa'ad bin Abdulaziz Al Saud and his United World Group. Châteauroux was in last place at the time he was hired, and remained in that position until the end of the season, getting relegated to the third-tier Championnat National. He was fired by Châteauroux on 11 October 2021, following a home loss to Concarneau, with the club in the middle of the table.

Career statistics

Club

International

Honours
AC Milan
Serie A: 1991–92, 1992–93, 1993–94, 1995–96
Supercoppa Italiana: 1993, 1994
European Cup/UEFA Champions League: 1989–90, 1993–94
European Super Cup: 1989, 1994
Intercontinental Cup: 1989

Paris Saint-Germain
Coupe de France: 1997–98
Coupe de la Ligue: 1997–98
Trophée des Champions: 1998

Monaco
French Division 1: 1999–2000
Trophée des Champions: 2000
Individual
Serie C1 top-scorer: 1987–88 (15 goals)
Ligue 1 Player of the Year: 1998
France Footballs Best Foreign Player in France: 1997–98, 1999–2000
AC Milan Hall of Fame

References

External links

Profile at FIGC.it  

1969 births
Living people
Italian footballers
Italy international footballers
Italy under-21 international footballers
Italian expatriate footballers
Como 1907 players
A.C. Legnano players
A.C. Milan players
Paris Saint-Germain F.C. players
Expatriate footballers in France
Expatriate footballers in Monaco
AS Monaco FC players
OGC Nice players
Serie A players
Serie C players
Ligue 1 players
Ligue 2 managers
Italian football chairmen and investors
Sportspeople from the Province of Varese
Italian expatriate sportspeople in France
Italian expatriate sportspeople in Monaco
Italian expatriate sportspeople in Switzerland
Virtus Bergamo Alzano Seriate 1909 players
Expatriate football managers in Monaco
Expatriate football managers in Switzerland
Italian football managers
AS Monaco FC managers
FC Lausanne-Sport managers
Tours FC managers
Stade Lavallois managers
Club Africain football managers
Marco Simone
LB Châteauroux managers
Association football forwards
Association football midfielders
Association football wingers
Italy B international footballers
UEFA Champions League winning players
Footballers from Lombardy